Elachista glomerella is a moth of the family Elachistidae. It is endemic to northern Queensland, Australia.

The forewings are blue in males and black with a bronzy sheen and three ochreous white markings in females. The hindwings are dark grey in both sexes.

The larvae have been reared on a Carex species.

References

Moths described in 2011
Endemic fauna of Australia
glomerella
Moths of Australia
Taxa named by Lauri Kaila